Joe Handrick (born 1965) is a former member of the Wisconsin State Assembly.

Biography
Handrick was born on November 2, 1965, in Minocqua, Wisconsin. Later, he would graduate from Lakeland Union High School and the University of Wisconsin–Madison with a degree in Occupational Therapy.  He is married and has three children.

Career
Handrick was first elected to the Assembly in 1994 and re-elected in 1996 and 1998. Handrick was appointed Minocqua Town Chairman in January 2006 following the resignation of Chairman Don Gauger. Handrick was re-elected to this post in 2007 and 2009. Additionally, he was a member of the Oneida County, Wisconsin Board from 1994 to 1996 and a member of the Lakeland High School Board of Education from 2008 to 2011. He is a Republican.

References

People from Minocqua, Wisconsin
School board members in Wisconsin
Mayors of places in Wisconsin
County supervisors in Wisconsin
University of Wisconsin–Madison School of Education alumni
1965 births
Living people
Republican Party members of the Wisconsin State Assembly